The 2023 McNeese Cowboys football team will represent McNeese State University as a member of the Southland Conference during the 2023 NCAA Division I FCS football season. They are led by second-year head coach Gary Goff. The Cowboys will play their home games at Cowboy Stadium in Lake Charles, Louisiana.

Schedule

References

McNeese
McNeese Cowboys football seasons
McNeese Cowboys football